Onotoa is an atoll of Kiribati. It is situated in the Gilbert Islands in the Pacific Ocean,  from Tamana, the smallest island in the Gilberts. The population of Onotoa in the 2015 census was 1,393.

The atoll is similar to many other atolls in the Gilbert Islands with its continuous line of islets and islands on the eastern side. The western side consists of a submerged reef which surrounds the islet filled lagoon.

Geography
It has 7 villages with Tabuarorae, an islet, located at the southernmost end of the island followed by Aiaki, Otoae, Temao, Buariki, Tanaeang and Tekawa at the northernmost end of the island. The villages are located along the lagoon coastal area throughout the island. The combined islets of Otoae and Aiaki are now easily accessible after the construction of a causeway from Temao to Aiaki. Tabuarorae is also connected to the rest of the island following the construction of a causeway.

Facilities are spread right across the island, with Onotoa Airport close to the northernmost village of Tekawa, the boat channel and wharf at the southern islet of Tabuarorae, the Junior Secondary School located between Otoae and Aiaki, and the main Council offices located between Temao and Buariki.

Environmental issues
The construction of causeways have also resulted to a significant reduction in the flushing of the lagoon that has resulted in low levels of oxygen in the lagoon, which has resulted in a lowering in the water quality. The erosion and accretion that are occurring along the shoreline is identified as being linked to aggregate mining, land reclamation and the construction of causeways that has been thought to change the currents along the shoreline.

Myths and legends
The name Onotoa means 'six giants'. The legend is told that a hunchback woman from Tarawa, living in a village of Nuatabu, had six sons who made fun of  her deformity. She ran away to Onotoa. The sons followed her and built her a home by piling up huge coral boulders - the remnants of which can be seen today.

History
In 1826 Captain Clark of the British whaling ship  was the first European to sight Onotoa, followed by Captain Chase of the American whaling ship, Japan.

Onotoa Post Office opened around 1912.

Notable residents
Taneti Mamau, President of Kiribati

Notes

References

Exhibit: The Alfred Agate Collection: The United States Exploring Expedition, 1838-1842 from the Navy Art Gallery

Gilbert Islands
Atolls of Kiribati